Lats or LATS may refer to:

 Latissimus dorsi muscle
 Latvian lats, former currency of Latvia
 Latin American Test Symposium of test and fault tolerance technologists
 Landfill Allowance Trading Scheme, a UK scheme to reduce biodegradable waste sent to landfill 
 Long Acting Thyroid Stimulants in Graves' disease